Daniel Tetrault (born September 4, 1979) is a Canadian professional ice hockey defenceman, having last played for and was a team captain with the Rapid City Rush of the ECHL. Tetrault was originally drafted 91st overall by the Montreal Canadiens in the 1997 NHL Entry Draft. From 2017 to 2021, he was head coach of the Rapid City Rush, leading the team to a 116–134–25 record over four seasons and never making a playoff appearance.

Tetrault won the Central Hockey League Most Outstanding Defenseman in the 2001–02 CHL season. The long-time CHL defenseman signed with the Allen Americans for the 2013–14 season. After claiming his first Ray Miron Cup championship with the Americans, Tetrault signed with the Rapid City Rush on July 31, 2014.

Career statistics

References

External links

1979 births
Living people
Canadian ice hockey defencemen
Allen Americans players
Austin Ice Bats players
Brandon Wheat Kings players
Bridgeport Sound Tigers players
Evansville IceMen players
Montreal Canadiens draft picks
New Mexico Scorpions (CHL) players
Peoria Rivermen (AHL) players
Port Huron Icehawks players
Rapid City Rush players
Trenton Titans players
Wichita Thunder players
Ice hockey people from Manitoba
People from Eastman Region, Manitoba
Canadian expatriate ice hockey players in the United States